Compsoctena byrseis is a moth in the family Eriocottidae. It was described by Edward Meyrick in 1934. It is found in the former Katanga and Kasai-Occidental provinces in the Democratic Republic of the Congo.

References

Moths described in 1934
Compsoctena
Lepidoptera of the Democratic Republic of the Congo